The BC Men's Curling Championship (formerly the belairdirect BC Men's Provincial Curling Championship and the Canadian Direct Insurance BC Men's Provincials) is the British Columbia provincial championship for men's curling. It was known as the Safeway Select up to 2003.  The tournament is run by Curl BC, the provincial curling association. The winner represents Team British Columbia at the Tim Hortons Brier.

Qualification 
The event features ten teams. The defending champions and the top team on the Canadian Team Ranking System from B.C. are invited to play. Two teams from the British Columbia coastal region and from the British Columbia interior earn berths, while and additional two teams from each of those two regions come out of a second round of qualifying.

Winners
Listed below are the provincial champion skips for each year. BC did not participate in the Brier until 1936. Brier champions are denoted in bold

References

Curl BC - Past Champions 

The Brier provincial tournaments
Curling in British Columbia